FCDA may refer to:

Federal Civil Defense Administration, a defunct official US government agency that operated from 1951 to 1958
Federal Civil Defense Authority, an official US government agency that operated from 1972 to 1979, when it was succeeded by the Federal Emergency Management Agency (FEMA)